Christina Scherwin (born 11 July 1976) is a Danish javelin thrower.

Scherwin threw the javelin at the Athens 2004 Summer Olympics and the Beijing 2008 Summer Olympics. Her biggest success was at the 2005 World Championships in Helsinki, where she threw the javelin 63.43 meters, placing fourth overall in the event. She finished second at the 2003 World University games in Daegu, sixth at the 2005 World Athletics Final in Monaco, fifth at the 2006 European Championships in Gothenburg, and third at the 2006 World Athletics Final in Stuttgart. In her junior years she placed 6th at the 1993 European Junior Championships and 5th at the 1994 World Junior Championships.

She holds the current Danish record with 64.83 meters, achieved at the 2006 World Athletics Final in September 2006. She also holds the current NCAA DIV III record set back in 2003.

Scherwin was the Danish national champion in the event in 2000, 2002, 2003, 2004, 2005, 2006 and 2008 and the NCAA DIV III national champion in 2002 and 2003. She represents Sparta.

Achievements

References

External links
Official website

1976 births
Living people
Danish female javelin throwers
Athletes (track and field) at the 2004 Summer Olympics
Athletes (track and field) at the 2008 Summer Olympics
Olympic athletes of Denmark
Universiade medalists in athletics (track and field)
Universiade silver medalists for Denmark
Medalists at the 2003 Summer Universiade